Rangi may refer to:

Names
Rangi, the primal sky father in Māori mythology
Rangi Chase, New Zealand rugby league footballer
Rangi Mātāmua, New Zealand Māori astronomer and indigenous studies academic
Rangi Topeora (died 1865-1873?), New Zealand tribal leader, peacemaker and composer of waiata
Anaru Rangi (born 1988), New Zealand rugby union footballer
Tutekohi Rangi (1871–1956), New Zealand Māori tohunga and faith healer

Fictional characters 

 Rangi, a character in the novel The Rise of Kyoshi and its sequel, The Shadow of Kyoshi

Groups of people
 Rangi (ethnic group), of Tanzania
 Rangi language, the language spoken by the Rangi people

Other uses
Rangi (video game), a virtual reality adventure puzzle video game
Kue rangi, Indonesian coconut waffle-like cake. 
Rangi (New Zealand slang), an adjective used to describe something of poor or cheap quality

Māori given names